The Temple of Diana Nemorensis was an ancient Roman sanctuary erected around 300 BC and dedicated to the goddess Diana. The temple was situated on the northern shore of Lake Nemi, beneath the cliffs of the modern city of Nemi (Latin nemus Aricinum). It was a pilgrimage site on the Italian peninsula. The temple complex covered an area of 45,000 square meters.

Historical evidence suggests that worship of Diana at Nemi flourished from at least the 6th century BCE The temple was abandoned at some point in the late Roman Empire period. If still in use by the 4th-century, it would have been closed during the persecution of pagans in the late Roman Empire.  Portions of its marbles and decorations were removed. The area of the temple was gradually covered by forest and generally left undisturbed for centuries. Amateur archaeological excavations of the site began in the 1600s.

Qualities
The temple of Diana Nemorensis was preceded by the sacred grove in which there stood a carved cult image. The temple was noted by Vitruvius as being archaic and "Etruscan" in its form. A. E. Gordon has observed that "the comparatively late date of the excavated remains of the sanctuary does not preclude the dedication of the grove at the end of the sixth century." Andreas Alföldi has demonstrated that the cult image still stood as late as 43 BC, when it was reflected in coinage.

 
The Italic type of the triform cult image of Diana Nemorensis was reconstructed by Alföldi from a sequence of later Republican period coins he connected with a gens from Aricia. In early examples the three goddesses stand before a sketchily indicated wood, the central goddess placing her right hand on the shoulder of one goddess and her left on the hip of the other. The three are shown to be one by a horizontal bar behind their necks that connects them. Later die-cutters simplified the image. Alföldi interpreted the numismatic image as the Latin Diana "conceived as a threefold unity of  the divine huntress, the Moon goddess, and the goddess of the nether world, Hekate," noting that Diana montium custos nemoremque virgo ("keeper of the mountains and virgin of Nemi") is addressed by Horace as diva triformis ("three-form goddess"). Diana is commonly addressed as Trivia by Virgil and Catullus. 
 
The votive offerings, none earlier than the fourth century BC, found in the grove of Aricia portray her as a huntress, and further as blessing men and women with offspring, and granting expectant mothers an easy delivery. The dedicatory inscription, long disappeared, was copied for its curiosity as testimony to the political union of Latin cities, the Latin league by Cato the Elder and transmitted, perhaps incompletely, by the grammarian Priscianus:
Lucum Dianium in nemore Aricino Egerius Baebius Tusculanus dedicavit dictator Latinus. hi populi communiter: Tusculanus, Aricinus, Lanuvinus, Laurens, Coranus, Tiburtis, Pometinus, Ardeatis Rutulus

Diana Nemorensis was not translated to Republican Rome by the rite called evocatio, as was performed for Juno of Veii, but remained a foreigner there, in a temple outside the pomerium, apparently on the Aventine.

A votive inscription of the time of Nerva indicates that Vesta, Roman goddess of the hearth, home, and family, was also venerated in the grove at Nemi.

The Golden Bough
Legend has it that Diana's high priest at Nemi, known as the Rex Nemorensis, was always an escaped slave who could only obtain the position by defeating his predecessor in a fight to the death. Sir James George Frazer wrote of this sacred grove in The Golden Bough, basing his interpretation on brief remarks in Strabo (5.3.12), Pausanias (2,27.24) and Servius' commentary on the Aeneid (6.136). The legend tells of a tree that stood in the center of the grove and was heavily guarded. No one was allowed to break off its limbs, with the exception of a runaway slave, who was allowed, if he could, to break off one of the boughs. He was then in turn granted the privilege to engage the Rex Nemorensis, the current king and priest of Diana, in a fight to the death. If the slave prevailed, he became the next king for as long as he could defeat his challengers. However, Joseph Fontenrose criticised Frazer's assumption that a rite of this sort actually occurred at the sanctuary, and no contemporary records exist that support the historical existence of the Rex Nemorensis.

Gallery

Bibliography 
 Giovanni Argoli, Epistola ad Jacobum Philippum Tomasinum de templo Dianae Nemorensis, in: Jacopo Filippo Tomasini, De donariis ac tabellis votivis liber singularis, Padova, 1654 in-4 pp. 13 ff.; reprinted in: 
 G. Ghini, Il Museo delle navi romane e Il Santuario di Diana di Nemi, Roma 1992.
 G. Ghini, F. Diosono,  Il Santuario di Diana a Nemi: recenti acquisizioni dai nuovi scavi,  in E. Marroni (ed.), Sacra Nominis Latini. I santuari del Lazio arcaico e repubblicano. Atti del Convegno, Roma 2009, Ostraka n.s. 2012, I, pp. 119–137.
 F. Coarelli, G. Ghini, F. Diosono, P. Braconi Il Santuario di Diana a Nemi. Le terrazze e il ninfeo. Scavi 1989-2009, Roma, L'Erma di Bretschneider, 2014, .
 Sculpture from the Sanctuary of Diana Nemorensis at Lake Nemi. In: Irene Bald Romano (ed.): Classical sculpture: catalogue of the Cypriot, Greek, and Roman stone sculpture in the University of Pennsylvania Museum of Archaeology and Anthropology. University of Pennsylvania 2006, pp. 73–159.
 Giulia D'Angelo - Alberto Martín Esquivel, P. Accoleius - Lariscolus (RRC 486/1) in Annali dell'Istituto Italiano di Numismatica, 58 (2012), pp. 139–160.

References

Temples of Diana
2nd-century BC religious buildings and structures
2nd-century BC establishments
Lake Nemi
Roman sites in Lazio